Sebastian Koch (born 31 May 1962) is a German television and film actor. He is known for roles in the 2007 Academy Award-winning film The Lives of Others, in Steven Spielberg's Bridge of Spies, and as Otto Düring in the fifth season of the Showtime series Homeland.

Childhood
Koch grew up in Stuttgart with his mother who was a single parent. He originally wanted to be a musician, but production by artistic director Claus Peymann influenced him in the late 1970s to change careers to become an actor.

Career

Theatre
From 1982 to 1985, Koch studied at the renowned Otto Falckenberg School in Munich. In addition to his cinematic work, he played a diversity of different roles on stage. Koch portrayed amongst other Peer Gynt and Leonce in Leonce and Lena at the municipal theatre of Darmstadt. At the Schiller theatre in Berlin he played the character Roller in Schiller's The Robbers and Orest in Goethe's Iphigenie auf Tauris. A couple of years later, he took over the role of Lord Goring in Oscar Wilde's An Ideal Husband in the playhouse Bochum under the direction of Armin Holz.

Film and television
Koch had his first TV appearance in 1980 in the 77th episode of the series Derrick, followed by an episode in the popular crime series Tatort in 1986. He acted in numerous thrillers like Der Mann mit der Maske, Die brennende Schnecke, and in 1997 in Heinrich Breloer's two-piece , in which he portrayed the role of Andreas Baader.

The latter was furthermore distinguished as "TV event of the year" with the German Television Award. In addition, Koch received the Bavarian TV Award for the same movie.

His first international productions included the historical drama Napoleon, which Koch in appeared alongside Gérard Depardieu, John Malkovich and Isabella Rossellini and brought him more attention. He portrayed the youthful lover of Catherine Deneuve, Rodolphe Löwenstein, in Marie und Freud.

Koch has portrayed historically significant personalities, among Rudolf Höss in Costa-Gavras Hochhuth's adaptation Amen (Der Stellvertreter). He appeared in The Tunnel, a made-for-television German film about the idea of going underground by digging a tunnel shortly after the construction of the Berlin wall in 1961, and in Peter Keglevic’s historical drama Two Days of Hope about the uprising on 17 June 1953. Koch appeared in Stauffenberg (2004 by Jo Baier and winner of the German Film Award); and he played Albert Speer in Heinrich Breoler's mini-series Speer und Er in 2004 – his third collaboration with the director following Death Game and The Manns – A Novel of the Century. He received for his performance as the Nazi architect Albert Speer the German TV Award.

Sebastian Koch appeared in Florian Henckel von Donnersmarck's drama The Lives of Others in 2006 as one of the leading roles. He portrayed the playwright Georg Dreyman, who lived in East Germany with his lover, a dissident who was spied on and monitored. The movie received an Oscar for Best Foreign Language Film in 2007 as well as the BAFTA Award, the César, and the German and European Film Award. Koch himself was nominated several times for his work in The Lives of Others and received the Globo d'oro for Best European Actor, The Quadriga, and the Bambi.

Paul Verhoeven's movie Black Book (Zwartboek) was also shot in 2006. Koch played a Nazi Officer in occupied Holland who falls in love with a Jewish member of the resistance (Carice van Houten). Black Book celebrated its premiere at the Venice Film Festival and the Toronto International Film Festival.

After shooting the movie  in 2007/2008, Koch appeared on camera for the international production of Jack London's classic psychological adventure novel Sea Wolf, where Koch portrayed a lone despot of both brutal cruelty and longing romance. The shooting of this two-parter based on Nigel Williams’ script and under Mike Barker’s direction took place in Halifax, Canada. The mini-series won the Directors Guild of Canada Award and Koch was nominated in 2010 for his role as Wolf Larsen for the international Emmy Award.

The shooting of the movie Manipulation (adapted from the novel Das Verhör des Harry Wind) took also place in 2008, with Koch and Klaus Maria Brandauer playing leading roles.

In 2010, Koch was the male title role in the English independent tragicomedy Albatross under the direction of Niall MacCormick. He played the role of Prof. Bressler in the movie Unknown (with Liam Neeson and Diane Kruger) under the direction of Jaume Collet-Serra. In the summer of 2010, he took a guest role alongside Eva Green and Joseph Fiennes in the TV series Camelot from the Irish RT Film production, followed by the UFA production Bella Block – Stich ins Herz under the direction of Stephan Wagner, in which Koch played the role of Max Klöckner. As a host of the ZDF production Terra X, Koch presented the Cologne Cathedral, the Neuschwanstein Castle and the Dresden Frauenkirche.

In 2011, Koch appeared in the Czech production The Shadow of the Horse (Ve Stinu), in which Koch played the leading role of the investigator Zenk, whose mission is to win through one personal rival and through the regime of communist Prague in the 50s. In the German production adapted from Bernhard Schlink's novel The Weekend in 2012, Koch portrays an amnestied RAF terrorist (Jens Kessler), who has a reunion with his old mates. In the same year, Koch began shooting the Greek-Russian drama film God Loves Caviar based upon the true story of Ioannis Varvakis, played by Koch, a former pirate who moved up to being a Greek caviar merchant and eventual benefactor from Psara. The international cast also included Catherine Deneuve as Catherine the Great of Russia and John Cleese as Officer McCormick. Furthermore, Koch played the title role in Suspension of Disbelief, a thriller by Mike Figgis, which was followed by part 5 of the Die Hard movies, with Koch as Bruce Willis' antagonist.

In 2013, Ridley Scott (director and producer) began working on The Vatican, a pilot episode for a Showtime series about intrigues concerning the Pope and mysteries and secrets within the Catholic Church. Koch played the role of the Vatican's secretary Cardinal Marco Malerba, who is one of the true potentates of the inner circle.

In the Austrian production  Koch portrayed Alfred Nobel in 2014, and in the French production Au nom de ma fille, based on a true story, Koch played Dieter Krombach, a German doctor who is accused of murdering his stepdaughter by her biological French father (played by Daniel Auteuil). The case had spanned 30 years and has caused considerable publicity because of the issues of French-German relations and vigilante justice it raised.

In 2014, Koch was also part of Steven Spielberg's historical dramatic thriller Bridge of Spies about the negotiations of the release of spies between the East and West. Lawyer James B. Donovan (Tom Hanks) is thrown into the centre of the Cold War and East German lawyer Wolfgang Vogel (Koch) is a key figure in the process. The film premiered at the New York Film Festival and was nominated for the 2016 Academy Award for Best Picture.

The biographical romantic drama film The Danish Girl by Academy Award winner Tom Hooper (The King's Speech) is about one of the first known recipients of sex reassignment surgery. Koch portrays Kurt Warnekros, a doctor at the Dresden Municipal Women's Clinic, who was one of the first to carry out such operations. The cast furthermore includes Eddie Redmayne and Alicia Vikander.

Subsequently, Koch filmed Fog in August (by director Kai Wessel), the first feature film to address the Nazis' euthanasia program and the hospital's staunch Nazi chief physician Werner Veithausen's (played by Koch) way of dealing with the issue.

Eventually, in 2015, Koch began shooting the fifth season of the Showtime series Homeland about bipolar CIA Officer Carrie Mathison (Claire Danes). After leaving the CIA, Carrie now works for German billionaire Otto Düring (Koch), a philanthropist who uses the money his family made through affiliation with the Nazis to help struggling people around the world, including in volatile regions of the Middle East. Düring hires her to be his head of security in Berlin.

In 2016, he collaborated again with director Florian Henckel von Donnersmarck for the feature film Never Look Away, produced by Wiedemann & Berg and Walt Disney. The subject of the drama is the life of an artist, loosely based on the biography of Gerhard Richter. Sebastian starrs alongside Tom Schilling, Paula Beer, Saskia Rosendahl, Oliver Masucci and Ina Weisse. Never Look Away was submitted as the German entry for the 2019 Academy Awards and was ultimately nominated by the Academy of Motion Picture Arts and Sciences in the categories of "Best Foreign Language Film" and "Best Cinematography". Sebastian Koch also won the Bambi award for "Best Actor National" in Never Look Away in 2018.

In 2020, Koch starred in the German-Canadian television series The Defeated by Måns Mårlind. In the thriller series Your Honor (German title Euer Ehren), a German-Austrian adaptation of the Israeli series Kvodo, which aired in April 2022, Koch embodies a incorruptible judge who violates his moral principles and breaks with law and order driven by the infinite love for his son and the concern for his son's life.

Sebastian Koch is a member of the Academy of Motion Picture Arts and Sciences, which awards the Oscar.

In addition to his acting work, he regularly delights audiences with symphonic-scenic readings, including Paradise with violinist Daniel Hope, Dream Story with the Hubert Nuss Jazz Quartet and The Kreutzer Sonata after L. Tolstoy, which Sebastian Koch dramaturgically adapted and conceived as a stage play with piano and violin.

Audiobooks
Koch has frequently served as an interpreter of both literary and musical-literary audiobooks and live performances of such. Current projects include Schumann – Scenes of a marriage (with Martina Gedeck) about the exchange of letters between Clara and Robert Schumann, and accompanied by Argentinean bandoneon virtuoso Roberto Russo Koch has also presented excerpts from The Player by Dostoyevsky. The premiere of a play reading of Rhapsody: A Dream Novel by Arthur Schnitzler – accompanied by compositions especially for jazz – took place at the Literature and Poetry Festival in Bad Homburg in 2011.

In 2012, he produced the audiobook Koch is reading Heuss about speeches and letters by Theodor Heuss in collaboration with Cherbuliez Productions.

Koch twice lent his voice to the audiobook edition of Brigitte – Strong Voices. In 2007, he recorded the novel A perfect friend (Martin Suter) followed by the crime story On the twelfth day (Wolfgang Schorlau) in 2014.

Personal life
Sebastian Koch lives in Berlin and has a daughter, Paulina (born 1995) and a son, Jacob (born 2013). He was in a relationship with actress Carice van Houten, whom he met on the set of the movie Black Book, from 2005 to 2009.

Filmography (selection)

 (1991) – Gerhardt
Death Came As a Friend (1991, TV film) – young Gerhard Selb
The Duck Bros./Dog Days (1991–2011, franchise) – Stanley (voice)
Cosimas Lexikon (1992) – Sven
 (1994, TV film) – Bernd Schild
Hart to Hart: Two Harts in 3/4 Time (1995, TV film) – Hans Ditsch
 (1996, TV miniseries) – Wismar
 (1997, TV film) – Andreas Baader
Gloomy Sunday (1999) – Obersturmbannführer Eichbaum
Das Tal der Schatten (1999) – von Sviet
The Tunnel (2001) – Matthis Hiller
 (2001, TV film) – Richard Oetker
Die Manns – Ein Jahrhundertroman (2001, TV miniseries) – Klaus Mann
Amen. (2002) – Rudolf Höss
Napoleon (2002, TV miniseries) – Maréchal Jean Lannes
Das fliegende Klassenzimmer (2003) – Robert 'Nichtraucher' Uthofft
 (2004, TV film) – Rodolphe Löwenstein
Stauffenberg,  Operation Valkyrie (2004, TV film) – Claus von Stauffenberg
 (2004) – Philipp
Speer und Er (2005, TV film) – Albert Speer
The Shell Seekers (2006, TV film) – Cosmo
The Lives of Others (2006) – Georg Dreyman
Black Book (2006) – Ludwig Müntze
Rudy: The Return of the Racing Pig (2007) – Thomas Bussmann
 (2008) – Dr. Hans Frick
Effi Briest (2009) – Geert von Instetten
Sea Wolf (2009, TV film) – Wolf Larsen
Manipulation (2011) – Harry Wind
Unknown (2011) – Professor Bressler
Camelot (2011, TV miniseries) – King Uther
Albatross (2011) – Jonathan
The Weekend (2012) – Jens Kessler
God Loves Caviar (2012) – Varvakis
In the Shadow,  Ve stínu (Czech title) (2012) – Zenke
Suspension of Disbelief (2012) – Martin
A Good Day to Die Hard (2013) – Yuri Komarov
October November (2013) – Andreas
The Galapagos Affair: Satan Came to Eden (2013) – Heinz Wittmer (voice)
Homeland (2015–2016, TV series) – Otto Düring
 (2014, TV film) – Alfred Nobel
The Danish Girl (2015) – Warnekros
Bridge of Spies (2015) – Wolfgang Vogel
Kalinka (2016) – Dieter Krombach
Fog in August (2016) – Dr. Werner Veithausen
Billionaire Ransom (2016) – Bobby Hartmann
Bel Canto (2018)
Never Look Away (2018)
11-11: Memories Retold (2018, Video game) – Kurt (voice)
The Name of the Rose (2019, TV miniseries)
The Defeated (2021 Netflix series)
Your Honor (2022, TV series)

Awards and Nominations (selection)
 2001 – German Television Awards nomination for best supporting actor in Der Tunnel
 2002
 Adolf Grimme Award for his portrayal of Richard Oetker in 
 Bavarian TV Award ("Blue Panther") for his portrayal of Klaus Mann in The Manns – A Novel of the Century
 Adolf Grimme Award for his portrayal of Klaus Mann in The Manns – A Novel of the Century
 Jupiter Award for his portrayal of Richard Oetker in 
 2003 – DIVA Award; nominated for "Best German Actor" at the Verleihung der Goldenen Kamera for his role in Napoleon.
 2004 – Golden Gong award for Stauffenberg; German Television Awards nomination for "Best Leading Actor" in Stauffenberg.
 2005 – Bavarian TV Award ("Blue Panther") for his portrayal of Albert Speer in Speer und Er; German Television Award for "Best Leading Role" in Speer und Er.
 2006 – Quadriga award for The Lives of Others (shared with Ulrich Mühe and the film's director, Florian Henckel von Donnersmarck); Bambi award for best actor (national).
 2007 – Globo d'Oro award for "Best European Actor" (Italy)

 2010 – Nomination for "Best Male Actor" for the International Emmy Award; Nomination as "Most Popular Actor" for the Austrian Romy TV award for his performance in Sea Wolf
 2013 – Nomination for "Best Supporting Actor" for the Czech Lion for The Shadow of the Horse (Ve Stinu)
2015 – Nomination for "Most Popular Actor" for the Austrian Romy TV award for his performance in 
2016 – Günter Rohrbach TV Award for his role in Fog in August; Nomination for the Screen Actors Guild Award in the category "Best Acting Ensemble in a Drama Series" for Homeland
2018 – Bambi award for "Best Actor National"
2019 – Nomination for "Best Actor" for the Austrian Romy TV award for his performance in Never Look Away
2020 – Golden Carp Film Award for "Best Performance by an Actor in a Supporting Role" for Never Look Away 
2021 – "Die Europa" award at the Braunschweig International Film Festival

References

External links

Sebastian Koch  at his management's website

Fan site 
Photographs of Sebastian Koch

1962 births
Living people
German male film actors
German male television actors
German male stage actors
20th-century German male actors
21st-century German male actors
Male actors from Stuttgart